Tommy Dunne (22 June 1946, in Glasgow – 2001) was a Scottish footballer who played as an inside forward. Dunne began his career in the mid-1960s with Leyton Orient, spending a short amount of time with the English side before returning to Scotland with Dumbarton. An equally short spell preceded a move to Albion Rovers, before a move to Dundee United towards the end of the decade. He then joined the Scottish junior side Irvine Meadow in June 1971.

References

External links
 

1946 births
Footballers from Glasgow
2001 deaths
Scottish footballers
Scottish Football League players
English Football League players
Leyton Orient F.C. players
Dumbarton F.C. players
Albion Rovers F.C. players
Dundee United F.C. players
Association football inside forwards
Irvine Meadow XI F.C. players
St Anthony's F.C. players